Classic is a 2016 Nepali romantic film directed by Dinesh Raut and produced by Subash Giri. The film features Aaryan Sigdel and Namrata Shrestha in lead roles. The movie is made under collaboration of Subash Entertainment and Aaryan Sigdel Entertainment. The movie features a love story of visually impaired leads.

Cast
Aaryan Sigdel as Samay 
Namrata Shrestha as Dristi 
Romi Ghimire
Sushil Kafle
Shishir Rana
Priyanka Karki
Amitesh Shah
Dayahang Rai
Bishwa Basnet
Sunil Rawal
Samuna K.C.
Sushil Kafle

Plot
Classic is a musical love story with Aaryan Sigdel (Samay) and Namrata Shrestha (Dristi) as the lead blind characters. Classic takes you through a musical journey of two lovers who go through love, twists and turbulence, success and failure in their lives. Dristi, an aspiring female singer of Blind Aashram meets Samay a band performer, after losing his eyesight he becomes a part of Aashram. Believing in her talent, Samay gives her a helping hand and her career begins to eclipse his.

Awards

References

2016 films
Nepalese romantic drama films